Ketlin Priilinn (born 31 March 1982 in Viljandi) is an Estonian writer, translator and freelance journalist.

Priilinn graduated in 2004 from the Eesti-Ameerika Äriakadeemia (Estonian-American Business College International) and began working as a freelance journalist. Often, she covered economic issues. She has written for the newspaper Äripäev, as well as the Ärielu, Director and Interjöör. Priilinn has authored a number of books for children, young people and adult readers. She has also translated four works from English into Estonian. Married in 2010 and now known as Ketlin Rauk, she continues to write books under the name Priilinn.

Selected works
 "Koeralaps Berta seiklused" (Tänapäev, 2005)
 "Lugusid koertest" (Kentaur, 2005)
 "Peaaegu Tuhkatriinu" (Kentaur, 2007)
 "Maarjamäe kägu" (Tänapäev, 2007)
 "Anna ja tema merisiga Julius" (Tänapäev, 2007)
 "Hõbeingel" (Tänapäev, 2007)
 "Tüdruk nimega Maricruz" (Kentaur, 2007)
 "Vaim" (Tänapäev, 2008)
 "Liiseli võti" (Tänapäev, 2008)
 "Hirm pole tähtis" (Kentaur, 2008)
 "Väike kuninganna" (Tänapäev, 2009)
 "Bertrande" (Tänapäev, 2009)
 "Mustlasplikad" (Tänapäev, 2009)
 "Sefiirist loss" (Tänapäev, 2010)
 "Ei iialgi ilma Murita" (Kentaur, 2010)
 "Liblikasonaat" (Tänapäev, 2010)
 "Evelini lood" (Tänapäev, 2011)
 "Igavesti sõbrad" (Tänapäev, 2012)
 "Armastusega fännidelt" (Tänapäev, 2012)
 "Kameeleonmees" (Tänapäev, 2013)
 "Miraculum" (Tänapäev, 2015)
 "Roosi ja Liisu seiklused" (Tänapäev, 2015)

References

1982 births
Estonian journalists
Estonian women journalists
Estonian children's writers
Estonian women children's writers
Estonian translators
Living people
21st-century Estonian writers
21st-century Estonian women writers
21st-century translators
People from Viljandi